Backspace is the keyboard key that originally pushed the typewriter carriage one position backwards and in modern computer systems moves the display cursor one position backwards, deletes the character at that position, and shifts back the text after that position by one position.

Typewriter
In some typewriters, a typist would, for example, type a lowercase letter A with acute accent (á) by typing a lowercase letter A, backspace, and then the acute accent key. This technique (also known as overstrike) is the basis for such spacing modifiers in computer character sets such as the ASCII caret (^, for the circumflex accent). Backspace composition no longer works with typical modern digital displays or typesetting systems. It has to some degree been replaced with the combining diacritical marks mechanism of Unicode, though such characters do not work well with many fonts, and precomposed characters continue to be used. Some software like TeX or Microsoft Windows use the opposite method for diacritical marks, namely positioning the accent first, and then the base letter on its position.

Computers
Although the term "backspace" is the traditional name of the key which deletes the character to the left of the cursor, the actual key may be labeled in a variety of ways, for example delete, Erase (for example in One Laptop Per Child), or with a left pointing arrow. A dedicated symbol for "backspace" exists as U+232B ⌫ but its use as a keyboard label is not universal.

The backspace is distinct from the delete key, which in paper media for computers would punch out all the holes to strike out a character, and in modern computers deletes text following it. Also, the delete key often works as a generic command to remove an object (such as an image inside a document, or a file in a file manager), while backspace usually does not.

Common use
In modern systems, the backspace key is often mapped to the delete character (0x7f in ASCII or Unicode), although the backspace key's function of deleting the character before the cursor remains.

The backspace key is commonly used to go back a page or up one level in graphical web or file browsers.

^H

Pressing the backspace key on a computer terminal would generate the ASCII code 08, BS or Backspace, a control code which would delete the preceding character. That control code could also be accessed by pressing Control-H, as H is the eighth letter of the Latin alphabet. Terminals which did not have the backspace code mapped to the function of moving the cursor backwards and deleting the preceding character would display the symbols ^H (caret, H) when the backspace key was pressed. Even if a terminal did interpret backspace by deleting the preceding character, the system receiving the text might not. Then, the sender's screen would show a message without the supposedly deleted text, while that text, and the deletion codes, would be visible to the recipient. This sequence is still used humorously for epanorthosis by computer literates, denoting the deletion of a pretended blunder, much like a strikethrough; in this case, however, the ^H symbol is faked by typing a regular '^' followed by typing a regular 'H'.

Example:
Be nice to this fool^H^H^H^Hgentleman; he's visiting from corporate HQ.

^W and ^U
An alternative sometimes seen is ^W, which is the shortcut to delete the previous word in the Berkeley Unix terminal line discipline. This shortcut has also made it into the insert mode of the Vi text editor and its clone Vim.

^U deletes a line.

Other meanings
In a mainframe environment, to backspace means to move a magnetic tape backwards, typically to the previous block.

Notes

References

Computer keys
Control characters